The United States Military Academy (USMA) is an undergraduate college in West Point, New York that educates and commissions officers for the United States Army. This list is drawn from alumni of the Military Academy who are veterans of World War I. This includes Tasker H. Bliss (class of 1875), Hunter Liggett (class of 1879), John J. Pershing (class of 1886), Douglas MacArthur (class of 1903), "Hap" Arnold (class of 1907), George S. Patton (class of 1909), and Thomas B. Larkin (class of 1915).



World War I veterans 
Note: "Class year" refers to the alumni's class year, which usually is the same year they graduated. However, in times of war, classes often graduate early.

References
General

Inline citations

West Point
Academy alumni, famous list
United States Army officers
W